The following is a list of mummies that have been found in Egypt dating to the pharaonic dynasties. This list includes people who were considered to be court officials, nobles, or commoners by historians. Some of these mummies have been found to be remarkably intact, while others have been damaged from tomb robbers and environmental conditions.

Identified

Disputed

Unknown
The following entries are mummies that have no conclusive identity. In the interim they have been given either nicknames or assumed names by historians until further research can be done.

See also
List of Theban tombs

References

Mummies
Mummies
Mummies
Ancient Egyptian mummies